On 23 November 2022, an Israeli Druze 17-year old student named Tiran Fero, from Daliyat al-Karmel, was severely injured in a car crash near the Palestinian city of Jenin, where he was going to a car mechanic. After being brought to a local hospital for treatment, he was reportedly removed from life support and held hostage by members of the Jenin Brigades, a Palestinian armed group.

Event 
Tiran Fero (24 November 2004 – 23 November 2022) was driving to Hebron with his friend Adir Daksa, intending to buy a new speaker system for his vehicle. He was one day away from celebrating his 18th birthday. His car lost control and the ensuing crash left both teenagers wounded, Fero seriously. While Daksa was brought to an Israeli hospital, Fero's serious injuries meant that he could not be transported to Israel. He was instead brought to a local Jenin hospital where he was placed on life support. Upon hearing the news his father Husam and uncle Edri both rushed to the hospital to be with their son. The hospital was later stormed a little over 8:30 PM by twenty members of the Palestinian group Jenin Brigades, who thought the hospital was treating a wounded Israeli soldier, according to a Palestinian official. The attackers disconnected Fero from the life support and held him hostage. Fero died shortly after according to his family, but his body was held hostage for 30 hours. While the Palestinian media and the IDF have both said that he had already died at the time of the kidnapping, Fero's father Husam and uncle Edri who were both in the same room as Fero when the attack happened said that he was still alive at the time of the abduction. The group stated it will only hand over Fero's body if Israel handed over the bodies of Palestinian militants killed while carrying out attacks against Israelis.

Israeli Druze, including the victim's father Tarif, threatened to storm Jenin themselves and retrieve Fero's body if it was not returned by the following day. Druze protesters blocked Highway 6 and the mayor of Daliyat el-Karmel urged residents of the town not to take the law into their own hands. Protesters were heard chanting "with soul and blood we will redeem Tiran." In related incidents, three Israeli Druze soldiers were arrested after throwing explosives at a Palestinian home in revenge. A video emerged in which a group of five masked armed Druze men showed three Palestinian workers they had kidnapped near Hebron. The men said that this action was "An eye for an eye, and a tooth for a tooth", threatening to harm the workers if Fero's body was not returned. The workers were later released after being beaten.

Palestinian Authority officials said they were trying to get the body back, in a rare instance of cooperation between the PA and the IDF. Several Palestinian and Israeli Arab politicians called for the body to be returned, including Ahmad Tibi, Governor of Jenin , local officials in Jenin, and Raed Salah (leader of the outlawed Northern Branch of the Islamic Movement in Israel organization).

The body of Tiran Fero was given back to his family after diplomatic pressure by several countries and an IDF warning to launch a large-scale operation if the body was not returned.

On December 1, Israeli forces killed one of the militants reportedly behind Fero's abduction.

At an Otzma Yehudit meeting on 5 December 2022, a cousin of Fero (Fero's family was attending the meeting) reiterated that the boy had died after being unplugged from the life support.

See also 

 2022 Jerusalem bombings, which happened on the same day as the kidnapping

References 

Attacks on buildings and structures in 2022
Attacks on buildings and structures in Asia
Attacks on hospitals
Druze community in Israel
Hostage taking in Asia
Jenin
November 2022 crimes in Asia
Terrorist attacks attributed to Palestinian militant groups
Terrorist incidents in the West Bank in 2022